A variety of placental mammals have been introduced to Australia since the arrival of Captain Cook in 1770. They have ranged in size from rodents to deer.

This is a sub-list of the list of mammals of Australia.  Note that this sub-list includes six species of introduced rodent that are also included in the rodents of Australia sub-list.

Rodentia

Muridae

House mouse, Mus musculus
Pacific rat, Rattus exulans
Brown rat, Rattus norvegicus
Black rat, Rattus rattus

Sciuridae

Five-lined palm squirrel, Funambulus pennantii
Eastern grey squirrel, Sciurus carolinensis (extirpated)

Lagomorpha

Leporidae
European rabbit, Oryctolagus cuniculus
European hare, Lepus europaeus

Carnivora

Canidae

 Dingo, Canis familiaris
Red fox, Vulpes vulpes

Felidae

 Cat, Felis catus

Artiodactyla

Cervidae

Chital, Axis axis
Indian hog deer, Axis porcinus
Red deer, Cervus elaphus
European fallow deer, Dama dama
Rusa deer, Rusa timorensis
Sambar deer, Rusa unicolor

Bovidae

Goat, Capra hircus
Banteng, Bos javanicus
Water buffalo, Bubalus bubalis

Camelidae

Dromedary, Camelus dromedarius

Suidae

Feral pig, Sus domesticus

Perissodactyla

Equidae

Brumby, Equus ferus caballus
Donkey, Equus africanus asinus

See also
 Invasive species in Australia
 List of mammals of Australia
 List of monotremes and marsupials of Australia
 List of bats of Australia
 List of rodents of Australia
 List of marine mammals of Australia

References

 iGoTerra Checklist of Mammals of Australia

 
Placental